The 2014 AFC Cup was the 11th edition of the AFC Cup, a football competition organized by the Asian Football Confederation (AFC) for clubs from "developing countries" in Asia. Al-Kuwait were the two-time defending champions, but were eliminated by Persipura Jayapura in the quarter-finals.

In the final, Al-Qadsia of Kuwait defeated Erbil of Iraq 4–2 on penalties after a 0–0 draw, to win their first AFC Cup title after losing in the previous year's final.

Allocation of entries per association
The AFC laid out the procedure for deciding the participating associations and the allocation of slots, with the final decision to be made by the AFC on 26 November 2013. The following changes to the list of participating associations may be made from the 2013 AFC Cup if the AFC approves the following applications made by any association:
An association originally participating in the AFC Cup may apply to participate in the 2014 AFC Champions League. An association may participate in both the AFC Champions League and the AFC Cup if it only partially fulfills the AFC Champions League criteria.
An association originally participating in the AFC President's Cup may apply to participate in the 2014 AFC Cup.

The following changes in the participating associations were made compared to the previous year:
Kyrgyzstan and Palestine clubs' participation were upgraded from the AFC President's Cup to the AFC Cup starting from 2014 by the AFC.

Each participating association was given either two entries to the group stage or one entry to the qualifying play-off, based on the AFC Technical Ranking and the number of associations in each zone.

Teams
The following teams entered the competition. Teams in italics played in the 2014 AFC Champions League qualifying play-off, but failed to advance to the AFC Champions League group stage (had they advanced to the AFC Champions League group stage, they would have been replaced by another team from the same association).

Notes

Schedule
The schedule of the competition was as follows (all draws held at AFC headquarters in Kuala Lumpur, Malaysia).

Qualifying play-off

The bracket for the qualifying play-off was determined by the AFC. Each tie was played as a single match. Extra time and penalty shoot-out were used to decide the winner if necessary. The winners of each tie advanced to the group stage to join the 30 automatic qualifiers.

|}

Group stage

The draw for the group stage was held on 10 December 2013. The 32 teams were drawn into eight groups of four. Teams from the same association could not be drawn into the same group. Each group was played on a home-and-away round-robin basis. The winners and runners-up of each group advanced to the round of 16.

Tiebreakers
The teams are ranked according to points (3 points for a win, 1 point for a draw, 0 points for a loss). If tied on points, tiebreakers are applied in the following order:
Greater number of points obtained in the group matches between the teams concerned
Goal difference resulting from the group matches between the teams concerned
Greater number of goals scored in the group matches between the teams concerned (away goals do not apply)
Goal difference in all the group matches
Greater number of goals scored in all the group matches
Penalty shoot-out if only two teams are involved and they are both on the field of play
Fewer score calculated according to the number of yellow and red cards received in the group matches (1 point for a single yellow card, 3 points for a red card as a consequence of two yellow cards, 3 points for a direct red card, 4 points for a yellow card followed by a direct red card)
Drawing of lots

Group A

Group B

Group C

Tiebreakers
Al-Qadsia and Al-Hidd are ranked on head-to-head record.

Group D

Group E

Tiebreakers
Churchill Brothers and Home United are ranked on head-to-head record.

Group F

Group G

Group H

Tiebreakers
Tampines Rovers and Pune are ranked on head-to-head record.

Knock-out stage

In the knock-out stage, the 16 teams played a single-elimination tournament. In the quarter-finals and semi-finals, each tie was played on a home-and-away two-legged basis, while in the round of 16 and final, each tie was played as a single match. The away goals rule (for two-legged ties), extra time (away goals do not apply in extra time) and penalty shoot-out were used to decide the winner if necessary.

Bracket

Round of 16
In the round of 16, the winners of one group played the runners-up of another group in the same zone, with the group winners hosting the match.

|-
!colspan=3|West Asia Zone

|-
!colspan=3|East Asia Zone

Quarter-finals
The draw for the quarter-finals was held on 28 May 2014. Teams from different zones could be drawn into the same tie, and the "country protection" rule was applied, so teams from the same association could not be drawn into the same tie.

Semi-finals

Final

The draw to decide the host team of the final was held after the quarter-final draw.

Awards

Top scorers

See also
2014 AFC Champions League
2014 AFC President's Cup

References

External links
AFC Cup, the-AFC.com

 
2
2014